Mouthpiece is a 2015 Canadian feminist play by Norah Sadava and Amy Nostbakken of Quote Unquote Collective.

Development 
Sadava and Nostbakken began working on the play in 2013. The play received dramaturgy from Orian Michaeli and features music composed by Nostbakken.

The script was later published by Coach House Books with an introduction from Michele Landsberg.

Plot 
Mouthpiece is a two-person play in which both actors play the same character, Cassandra. Cassandra is a writer who finds out her mother has just died and must deal with preparations for the funeral. She must write the eulogy but finds she has lost the ability to speak. The play takes place in a span of twenty-four hours and is set in present-day Toronto.

Performance history 
Mouthpiece premiered in 2015 at The Theatre Centre in Toronto starring Sadava and Nostbakken and directed by Nostbakken. In 2016, the production was staged by Nightwood Theatre as part of a double bill. In 2017, Jodie Foster brought Quote Unquote to Los Angeles to performa a two show run of Mouthpiece. Foster first saw the play in Toronto. Also in 2017, they performed the play at the Edinburgh Fringe Festival. In 2018, 2b Theatre brought Quote Unquote Collective and Mouthpiece to Nova Scotia. It was performed at Alderney Landing in Dartmouth. Sadava said that this performance would be the last time she and Nostbakken would perform the play in Canada.

Awards

Adaptation 

In 2018, Mouthpiece was adapted into a film starring Sadava and Nostbakken and directed by Patricia Rozema.

References

Canadian plays
2015 plays
Feminist plays
Dora Mavor Moore Award-winning plays
Plays set in Canada